Përparim may refer to:

Përparim, Berat, a village in the municipality of Skrapar, Berat County, Albania
Përparim, Elbasan, a village in the municipality of Peqin, Elbasan County, Albania
Përparim, Gjirokastër, a village in the municipality of Memaliaj, Gjirokastër County, Albania
Përparim Hetemaj, Albanian footballer

Albanian masculine given names